Succinella is a genus of small, air-breathing, land snails, terrestrial pulmonate gastropod molluscs in the family Succineidae, commonly called amber snails.

They usually live in damp habitats such as marshes.

Distribution
This genus of snails lives on the continent of Eurasia.

Species
Species within the genus Succinella include:
 † Succinella hartmutnordsiecki (Schlickum & Strauch, 1979) 
 † Succinella martinovici (Brusina, 1902) 
 Succinella oblonga Draparnaud, 1801 - the type species

References

 Bank, R. A. (2017). Classification of the Recent terrestrial Gastropoda of the World. Last update: July 16th, 2017.
 AnimalBase info at:

External links
 Mabille, J. (1871). Histoire malacologique du bassin parisien ou histoire naturelle des animaux mollusques terrestres et fluviatiles qui vivent dans les environs de Paris. Premier fascicule. 1-128, pl. 1-2. Paris, Bouchard-Huzard
 An image of four shells of S. oblonga at: 

Succineidae
Taxa named by Jules François Mabille